Morter is a subdivision of the municipality of Latsch in South Tyrol, Italy.

Cities and towns in Trentino-Alto Adige/Südtirol